The Konya-Karaman Regional is a  regional passenger rail service operated by TCDD Taşımacılık. The train runs 4 times, in each direction, between Konya and Karaman on the Konya-Yenice railway. The train operates alongside the three daily YHT high-speed trains running south of Konya and serve as connecting service to high-speed trains terminating in Konya. Together with YHT trains and the Taurus Express (Konya-Adana), the Konya-Karaman Regional make up four of the eight daily round-trips between the two cities. The first train departed Konya on 23 August 2011.

References

Railway services introduced in 2011
2011 establishments in Turkey
Transport in Konya Province
Konya
Meram District
Çumra
Karaman
Transport in Karaman Province
Regional rail in Turkey